Sir John Arnott, 1st Baronet (1814–1898), was an Irish entrepreneur.

John Arnott may also refer to:
John Arnott (English footballer) (1932–2017), English footballer
John Arnott (Scottish footballer), Scottish footballer
John Arnott (politician) (1871–1942), Scottish politician
Sir John Arnott, 2nd Baronet (1853–1940) of the Arnott baronets
Sir John Arnott, 5th Baronet (1927–1981) of the Arnott baronets

See also
John Arnot (disambiguation)
Arnott (disambiguation)